The outcomes of the Turkish general elections before 1980 (more specifically between 1946 and 1977) is as follows. After coup d'etat in 1980 all political parties were closed by the military rule. For the elections after 1980 see Turkish general elections after 1980.
In the table below only the percentage of the votes received by the parties which were qualified to send representatives to the parliament are shown. Thus, the summation of percentages may be lower than 100%. The winner is shown in color. The legend of the abbreviations is shown at the end of the table.

Legent of the abbreviations 
CHP:Republican People's Party
DP:Democrat Party
MP:Nation Party
Later CMP:Republican Nation Party
HP:Liberty Party
AP:Justice Party
CKMP: Republican Peasants' Nation Party (former CMP after merging with another party)
Later MHP: National Movement Party
YTP:New Turkey Party
MP:Nation Party (issued from CKMP)
TİP:Turkish Workers' Party
GP: Confidence Party (issued from CHP)
Later CGP:Republican Confidence Party
BP: Unity Party
Later TBP: Unity Party of Turkey
DP:Democratic Party (issued from AP)
MSP: National Salvation Party

See also 
Turkish local elections before 1980

References 

General elections in Turkey
General, 1980-